Separatista is a genus of sea snails, marine gastropod mollusks in the family Capulidae.

Species
Species within the genus Separatista include:
 Separatista flavida (Hinds, 1843)
 Separatista helicoides (Gmelin, 1791)
 Separatista separatista (Dillwyn, 1817)

Species brought into synonymy 
 Separatista benhami Suter, 1902 : synonym of Zelippistes benhami (Suter, 1902
 Separatista chemnitzi (A. Adams, 1855): synonym of Separatista helicoides (Gmelin, 1791)
 Separatista fraterna Iredale, 1936 : synonym of Separatista helicoides (Gmelin, 1791)
 Separatista gracilenta (Brazier, 1878) : synonym of Separatista flavida (Hinds, 1843)

References

External links

Capulidae
Taxa named by John Edward Gray